The men's English billiards singles tournament at the 2006 Asian Games in Doha took place from 4 December to 5 December at Al-Sadd Multi-Purpose Hall.

Schedule
All times are Arabia Standard Time (UTC+03:00)

Results

Finals

Top half

Bottom half

References 
Results
Draw

External links 
 Official Website

Cue sports at the 2006 Asian Games